Letychiv Fortress is a complex of limestone walls built in 1598 by Jan Potocki to defend Podolia from the regular raids of the Crimean Tatars. The north-western tower, the eastern wall and parts of the southern wall still stand in the town of Letychiv, Ukraine. The most prominent feature on the grounds of the fortress is the Baroque church of the Assumption (1606-1638, rebuilt 1724). There's also a statue of Ustym Karmaliuk, a rebel leader buried at Letychiv. During World War II, the castle served as a notorious slave labor camp.

See also 
 Medzhybizh Fortress

References
 Памятники градостроительства и архитектуры Украинской ССР. Киев: Будивельник, 1983—1986. Том 4, с. 218.

Castles in Ukraine
Buildings and structures in Khmelnytskyi Oblast
Forts in Ukraine
1598 establishments in the Polish–Lithuanian Commonwealth